The following is a timeline of the history of the city of Porto, Portugal.

Prior to 19th century

 5th-4th C. BCE - "Fortified settlement of Cale" active.
 300 BCE - Town "strengthened and developed by the Romans."
 540 CE - Visigoths in power (approximate date).
 559 CE - Church of São Martinho de Cedofeita built.
 588 CE - Roman Catholic Diocese of Porto established.
 716 - Moors in power.
 997 - Christians in power.
 1120 - "Ecclesiastical city" founded per "royal endowment."
 12th C.- Porto Cathedral construction begins.
 1234 - Church of São Francisco built.
 1238 - Church of Saint Domingos built.
 1325 - Custom House built.
 1370s - Construction of Fernandina Wall completed.
 1386 - Judiaria do Olival (Jewish quarter) established.(pt)
 1410 - Church of São Francisco rebuilt.
 1520s -  (street) opens.
 1548 - Inquisition begins.
 1559 -  (church) built.
 1580 - 24 October: Capture of Porto by Spanish forces.
 1582 -  (law court) established.
 1622 - Printing press in operation.
 1628 - Tax revolt.
 1661 - Tax revolt.
 1692 -  (church) construction begins.
 1703 - Methuen Treaty on wines taxes facilitated export of port wine.
 1734 - Episcopal Palace construction begins.
 1750s - Clérigos Church built.
 1756 - Douro Wine Company founded.
 1757 - Unrest "against the wine monopoly."
 1762 -  (street) opens.
 1763 - Clérigos Church tower built.
 1764 -  (courthouse and prison) built.
 1770 -  construction begins.
 1779 -  (church) consecrated.
 1790 - British Factory House built.
 1798 - Teatro do Príncipe (theatre) opens.

19th century
 1806 -  (bridge) built.
 1808 - Anti-French unrest.
 1809
 28 March: First Battle of Porto; French forces defeat Portuguese.
 12 May: Second Battle of Porto; French defeated.
 1820 - Military insurrection in Porto launches Portuguese Liberal Revolution of 1820.
 1832 - July: Siege of Porto begins during the Portuguese Civil War.
 1833
 August: Siege ends.
 Royal Library of Porto and title of Duke of Porto established.
 1834 -  founded.
 1842 - Palácio da Bolsa (stock exchange) construction begins.
 1843 -  (bridge) opens.
 1846 - 6 October: "Military revolt."
 1854 - Comércio do Porto newspaper begins publication.
 1855 - Oporto Cricket and Lawn Tennis Club founded.
 1858 - Population: 81,200.
 1859 - Teatro Baquet (theatre) opens.
 1864 - Population: 86,751.
 1865 - 18 September: 1865 International Exhibition opens in Porto; Crystal Palace built.
 1868 - O Primeiro de Janeiro newspaper and  begin publication.
 1870 - Alfândega Porto Congress Centre built.
 1872 - Horsecar tram begins operating.
 1876 - Municipal Library of Porto established.
 1877
 Campanhã railway station opens.
 Construction of Linha do Norte (railway) to Lisbon completed.
 Maria Pia Bridge opens.
 1878 - Population: 105,838.
 1886 - Dom Luís I Bridge opens.
 1888
 20 March: Teatro Baquet burns down, killing dozens.
 Jornal de Notícias (newspaper) begins publication.
 1889 - Wine industry strike; crackdown.
 1890 - Population: 138,860.
 1891
 January: ; crackdown.
 22 November: "Exhibition of National Manufactures" opens.
 Funicular dos Guindais begins operating.
 1893 - FC Porto (football club) formed.
 1894 -  (church) built.
 1895 - Electric tram begins operating.
 1900 - Population: 167,955.

20th century
 1903 - Boavista F.C. (football club) formed.
 1906 - 29 August: Floor collapses in newspaper office, killing several.
 1908 - High Life cinema in business.
 1909 - Population: 189,663.
 1911
 University of Porto established.
 Estádio do Bessa (stadium) opens.
 Population: 194,009 in city; 679,978 in district.
 1912 -  and Olympia cinema in business.
 1913 - Campo da Constituição football playground opens.
 1919 - January–February: Porto becomes capital of the short-lived revolutionary Monarchy of the North.
 1920 -  built.
 1923 - Rivoli Theatre in business.
 1926 - Faculdade de Engenharia da Universidade do Porto active.
 1932 - Garagem do Comércio do Porto built.
 1934 - Portuguese colonial exhibition held
 1938 - Kadoorie Synagogue built.
 1941 - Coliseu do Porto (theatre) opens.
 1944 - Porto Editora (publisher) in business.
 1946 - Sociedade de Transportes Colectivos do Porto public transit entity founded.
 1951 - University of Porto's Botanical Garden established.
 1952 - Estádio das Antas (stadium) opens.
 1978 - Torre do Foco built.
 1979 - Faculdade de Arquitectura da Universidade do Porto established.
 1982 - City joins the regional Serviço Intermunicipalizado de Gestão de Resíduos do Grande Porto.
 1985 - Banco Comercial Português and Banco Português de Investimento headquartered in Porto.
 1988 - April:  meets in Porto.
 1996 - Porto designated an UNESCO World Heritage Site.
 1997 - Portuguese Centre of Photography founded.
 1999
 Serralves museum and Hotel Vila Galé built.
  becomes mayor.
 2000 - Cm-porto.pt website online (approximate date).

21st century
 2001
 Oliveira's Porto of My Childhood documentary film released.(pt)
 4 March:Hintze Ribeiro disaster, collapse of bridge near Porto kills 59 people.
 2002 - Rui Rio becomes mayor.
 2003 - Estádio do Dragão (stadium) opens.
 2013 - Rui Moreira becomes mayor.
 2017 - 1 October: Portuguese local election, 2017 held.

See also
 History of Porto
  since 1822
 List of bishops of Porto 
 
 
 Timelines of other cities/municipalities in Portugal: Braga, Coimbra, Funchal (Madeira), Lisbon, Setúbal

References

This article incorporates information from the Portuguese Wikipedia.

Bibliography

in English

in Portuguese
  (+ Index)

External links
 
 

 
porto
porto
Years in Portugal